Carbery GAA is a Gaelic football and Hurling division in the south-west area of County Cork, Ireland. The division is one of eight divisions of the Cork County Board and a division is responsible for organising competitions for the clubs within the division from Under 12 up to adult level The winners of these competitions compete against other divisional champions to determine which club is the county champion. In addition, the division selects football and hurling teams from the adult teams playing at junior level or county intermediate level, and these then compete for the Cork GAA Senior Football Championship and Cork Senior Hurling Championship.

The Carbery division consists of 26 clubs from Bandon in the east to Bantry Blues in the west.

List of clubs
 Argideen Rangers
 Ballinascarthy
 Bandon
 Bantry Blues
 Barryroe
 Carbery Rangers
 Castlehaven
 Clann na nGael
 Clonakilty
 Diarmuid Ó Mathúnas
 Dohenys
 Gabriel Rangers
 Goleen
 Ilen Rovers
 Kilbrittain
 Kilmacabea
 Kilmeen and Kilbree
 Muintir Bháire
 Newcestown
 O'Donovan Rossa
 Randal Óg
 St Colum's
 St James
 St Mary's
 St Oliver Plunketts
 Tadhg MacCarthaigh

Honours
Recent:

 Cork Senior Football Championship Winners (4): 1937, 1968, 1971, 2004  Runners-Up: 1931, 1964, 1973, 1974, 2000
 Cork Senior Hurling Championship Winners (1): 1994  Runners-Up 1993

Football
Gaelic football is the stronger of the two sports played by clubs in this division. All 26 clubs play football at adult level.

Competitions 

 Junior A Football Championship
 Junior B Football Championship
 Junior C Football Championship
 Junior D Football Championship
 Minor A Football Championship
 Minor B Football Championship
 Minor C Football Championship
 Under-21 A Football Championship
 Under-21 B Football Championship
 Under-21 C Football Championship

Grades

Hurling
Several teams don't play hurling at adult level. Some of these have started playing underage hurling, namely Carbery Rangers, Ilen Rovers, Kilmacabea, Goleen Those who don't play hurling at any level are Muintir Bháire, Tadhg MacCarthaigh, Castlehaven and Clann na nGael.

Competitions 
 South West Junior A Hurling Championship
 South West Junior B Hurling Championship
 South West Junior C Hurling Championship
 Minor A Hurling Championship
 Minor B Hurling Championship
 Under-21 A Hurling Championship
 Under-21 B Hurling Championship
 Under-21 C Hurling Championship

Grades

References

External sources
 Divisional website

Divisional boards of Cork GAA
Gaelic games clubs in County Cork
Gaelic football clubs in County Cork